Luis Salvadores Salvi (born in Lanco, Los Ríos Region, Chile on August 26, 1932 - died in Temuco, Chile on February 1, 2014) was a Chilean basketball player who competed in the 1956 Summer Olympics. One of nine boys and two girls, he and his brothers established the Salvadores Salvi name as part of the basketball legend of Chile. One of his brothers, Alvaro Salvadores, was also well-known in professional basketball.

Biography
Luis Salvadores Salvi shot his first basket at the San José de Temuco school in 1944, shortly after arriving from his native Lanco to study Humanities. At age 16, he joined the Deportivo San José club, winning the championship. In the same year, 1949, he joined the Temuco league, participating in two major championships, the "Provincias del Sur", or "Southern Provinces", winning in Osorno, and the "Campeonato Nacional" or "National Championship", winning in Santiago, Chile. This is how his fifty-year-old basketball career started, which would also include his participation in the 1956 Melbourne Olympic Games, the 1959 FIBA World Championship and two South American Championships. An earthquake caused him to miss the 1960 Olympic Games. He continued to play basketball until he was 78 in a senior league, playing alongside one of his sons. He resided in Temuco, Chile and was well-respected around the area.

Clubs
 Deportivo San José - (Chile) - 1948 to 1949 and 1962 to 1974
 Universidad de Chile - (Chile) - 1950-1954
 Club Deportivo Huachipato - (Chile) - 1955-1958
 Unión Deportiva Española - (Chile) - 1959-1961

Individual honors
 Best Basketball Player of Chile - 1966
 The "Mejor de los Mejores" Award for best athlete in Chile in all disciplines - 1968 and 1969

See also
Chile national basketball team

References

External links

Chilean men's basketball players
1959 FIBA World Championship players
Olympic basketball players of Chile
Basketball players at the 1956 Summer Olympics
People from Lanco
1932 births
2014 deaths